USS Chatham was a Confederate side-wheel steamer captured by the Union Navy during the American Civil War. She was used by the Union Navy as a harbor ship, used to transport military personnel, dispatches, and supplies to and from ships anchored in the harbor.

Confederate service
Chatham — an iron side-wheel steamer — was built in 1836 by John Laird, Birkenhead, England for export to Savannah, Georgia, knocked-down. Assembled in Savannah, she was used as a river steamer until the Civil War when she became a blockade runner. She was captured by  while attempting to run the blockade on 16 December 1863.

Union service
Chatham was turned over to the South Atlantic Blockading Squadron and commissioned on 22 June 1864, Master E. L. Smith in command.
 
Assigned as harbor ship at Port Royal, South Carolina, Chatham transported men and supplies in the harbor throughout the remainder of the war, providing support to the South Atlantic Blockading Squadron as it carried out its mission of cutting the Confederacy off from overseas sources of supply.  

Chatham was decommissioned in April 1865 and sold on 2 September.

References
 

Ships of the Union Navy
Steamships of the United States Navy
Dispatch boats of the United States Navy
American Civil War auxiliary ships of the United States
Ships built on the River Mersey
1836 ships